Johann Passler (born 18 August 1961) is a former Italian biathlete. At the 1988 Olympics in Calgary, Passler won bronze medals in the 20 km and in the relay. At the World Championships, Passler won two gold medals and two bronze.

Biathlon results
All results are sourced from the International Biathlon Union.

Olympic Games
2 medals (2 bronze)

World Championships
4 medals (2 gold, 2 bronze)

*During Olympic seasons competitions are only held for those events not included in the Olympic program.
**Team was added as an event in 1989.

Individual victories
3 victories (1 In, 2 Sp)

*Results are from UIPMB and IBU races which include the Biathlon World Cup, Biathlon World Championships and the Winter Olympic Games.

Further notable results
 1982: 2nd, Italian championships of biathlon
 1983:
 1st, Italian championships of biathlon
 1st, Italian championships of biathlon, sprint
 1986: 3rd, Italian championships of biathlon, sprint
 1988:
 1st, Italian championships of biathlon, sprint
 2nd, Italian championships of biathlon
 1990:
 1st, Italian championships of biathlon
 3rd, Italian championships of biathlon, sprint
 1991:
 2nd, Italian championships of biathlon
 2nd, Italian championships of biathlon, sprint
 1992: 1st, Italian championships of biathlon, sprint
 1993:
 1st, Italian championships of biathlon, sprint
 3rd, Italian championships of biathlon
 1994: 2nd, Italian championships of biathlon, sprint
 1995: 2nd, Italian championships of biathlon

References

External links
 
 

1961 births
Living people
People from Rasen-Antholz
Germanophone Italian people
Italian male biathletes
Biathletes at the 1984 Winter Olympics
Biathletes at the 1988 Winter Olympics
Biathletes at the 1992 Winter Olympics
Biathletes at the 1994 Winter Olympics
Olympic biathletes of Italy
Medalists at the 1988 Winter Olympics
Olympic medalists in biathlon
Olympic bronze medalists for Italy
Biathlon World Championships medalists
Biathletes of Centro Sportivo Carabinieri
Sportspeople from Südtirol